The Society of Professional Economists is a British network of professional economists. Its members are drawn from all areas of the discipline including financial and professional services, business, journalism, government, consultancy, business schools and universities. Membership is open to anyone who has a degree with substantial economic content and/or works in an area of economic endeavour or investigation.

The Society of Professional Economists organises networking events, professional development and education as well as a high-profile conferences and an annual dinner. It provides a monthly newsletter with updates on these events, links to events organised by other professional bodies, new members and economic news. The Society also reviews books and provides a forum for members to advertise job opportunities and their own events.

The Society exists to help all those who use economics in their professional work. Its activities aim to demonstrate the use of economic analysis as a tool to support business decision-making and to enhance the standing of the professional economist working outside academia. It provides a forum for its members to discuss and debate economic issues and helps them keep in touch with practical and theoretical developments within the discipline.

The Society particularly welcomes younger members to engage through its social networks on Facebook and LinkedIn and has membership packages aimed specifically at those who are embarking on a career in the profession. The Society also offers affiliate membership to individuals who are interested in economics but not practicing.

Activities

Monthly meetings 
Monthly meetings are the core of the SPE's activities, and typically run from September to July at lunchtime or in the evening. Distinguished speakers from the UK and abroad and from both the private and public sectors address a wide range of topical issues with time for questions and discussion. Evening meetings are followed by drinks and the opportunity to network with other SPE members from a wide range of organisations.

Post-fiscal event briefings are held with HM Treasury following Budgets and Autumn Statements. They offer SPE members the opportunity to discuss the macroeconomic aspects of what has been announced, and UK fiscal policy more generally.

Annual conferences 
Recent annual conferences have featured Ben Broadbent, Sir Charles Bean, Robert Chote, Gavyn Davies, Dame DeAnne Julius, Professor Diane Coyle, Evan Davies, Stephanie Flanders, Professor Philip Lane and Sir Dave Ramsden.

Annual dinners 
SPE annual dinners attract high-profile national and international guest speakers. Past speakers have included Dr Mark Carney, Sir John Vickers, Sir Gus O’Donnell, Sir Howard Davies, Jean-Claude Trichet, Mario Draghi, William C Dudley, Prof Axel Weber, Christian Noyer and Dr James Bullard. The guest speaker for 2019 was George Osborne.

Masterclasses 
Masterclasses on current issues and new developments contribute to continuing professional development. Members use these events to refresh or update their knowledge, and provide further opportunities to get to know other members and build networks.

Professional development 
The SPE runs a Continuous Professional Development Programme and a series of masterclasses presented by leading lights in their field.

Recruitment 
The SPE has an active jobs board. A large number of employers and recruiters advertise job opportunities for economists through the Society.

The Rybzcynski prize 
This prize is awarded annually by the Society to the author of the year's best piece of writing on an issue of importance to professional economists.

Publications 
The Society produces a monthly newsletter, book reviews, a regular salary survey and reports and webcasts from its events.

History 
The Society of Professional Economists was initially established as The Business Economists Group in 1953. When Sir Campbell Fraser of the Economist Intelligence Unit, with the aid of three of his own colleagues as well as John Dixon of Dunlop and Clive Dalton of Esso, set up a meeting with a view to establishing a small group of economists working in business. [Reference: Donald Anderson challenge of change]. The group wanted to discuss professional challenges in responding to the UK's relatively poor post-war economic recovery [Reference: Donald Anderson challenge of change].

The first Business Economists Group meeting took place in 1953, in the St Ermin's Hotel in Westminster, London. The attendance list shows there were thirty-three attendees: thirteen from industry, seven from consultancies and market research organisations, three from financial sectors, and one from the National Institute for Economic and Social Research. The remaining six were from government organisations. The aim of this first meeting was to: 
 Discuss the divergence between the real world challenges and economic theory. 
 Keep up-to-date with developments in economic theory.
 Exchange views and analyse government policies, trends and current affairs. 
 Develop a ‘group’ that could facilitate the exchange of ideas and experiences and so mitigate professional isolation. 
 Provide professional standards for business economists and promote the interests of the ‘groups’ members.
 The Society's aims today remain largely unchanged but reflect the reality of economics as it is now practiced professionally and the needs of economists to network and engage in lively debate across many platforms in order to keep on top of the rapid developments in the subject area.

Membership 
The Society of Professional Economists is a membership organisation. Its members are drawn from all areas of economics, including financial and professional services, business, journalism, government, consultancy, business schools and universities. Membership is open to anyone who has a degree with substantial economic content and/or works in an area of economic endeavour or investigation.

It has four types of members: Full members, student or early career members, affiliate members and corporate members.

Notable members include:
Vicky Pryce
DeAnne Julius
Lord Burns
Richard O'Brien
Bridget Rosewell
Diane Coyle

Past members include:
David Walton

Governance 
The SPE is governed by a council of 12 elected members, with all full members and fellows eligible for election.

Presidents and Vice Presidents 
The Chairman, President and Vice Presidents are elected by council members. The current President is Sir Dave Ramsden CBE. Vice Presidents are Sir Charlie Bean, Dame Kate Barker and Sir John Vickers. The current Chairman is Kevin Daly.

Current Council members 
Kevin Daly (Chair),
Dame Kate Barker,
James Lambert (Treasurer),
Catherine Connolly,
Sandra Curtis (Honorary Secretary),
George Buckley,
Ian Harwood,
Sunil Krishnan,
Adrian Majumdar,
Stephen Meredith,
Ian Mulheirn,
Rain Newton-Smith,
Amanda Rowlett.

References

External links 
 

Business in the United Kingdom
Professional associations based in the United Kingdom
Business and finance professional associations
Organizations established in 1953
1953 establishments in the United Kingdom